Nikoleta Stefanova (born 22 April 1984) is a Bulgarian-born female table tennis player competing for Italy. From 2003 she won several medals in single, double, and team events in the Table Tennis European Championships.

She competed at the 2008 Summer Olympics, reaching the second round of the singles competition. She competed in both singles and doubles at the 2004 Summer Olympics.

See also
 List of table tennis players

References

 2008 Olympic profile

1984 births
Living people
Italian female table tennis players
Table tennis players at the 2004 Summer Olympics
Table tennis players at the 2008 Summer Olympics
Olympic table tennis players of Italy
Bulgarian emigrants to Italy
Mediterranean Games gold medalists for Italy
Competitors at the 2009 Mediterranean Games
Mediterranean Games medalists in table tennis
People from Lovech Province